WREP-LD, virtual and UHF digital channel 15, is a low-powered YTA TV-affiliated television station licensed to Martinsville, Indiana, United States. The station is owned by the Metropolitan School District of Martinsville.

In addition to America One programming, the station broadcasts over 100 IHSAA sporting events and Coaches' shows throughout the year.

External links
 

REP-LD
Television channels and stations established in 1990
Low-power television stations in the United States
YTA TV affiliates